Statues of Our Lady of Danajon and Santo Niño ref,er to the Virgin Mary and Holy Child (Jesus Christ) respectively. Such statues were placed underwater in 2010 to stop dynamite fishing in the Danajon Bank, a double barrier reef.

Blast fishing was common in Danajon Bank, leading to destruction of the endangered coral reef--one of only six double barrier reefs in the world. The Bien Unido government and SeaKnights organization placed large statues of the Virgin Mary and Hseoly Child near the reef in 2010, hoping that the catholicism of the fishermen would prevent potentially harming the statues, thus stopping dynamite fishing. This was successful; these fishing techniques were substantially reduced.

References 

Statues in the Philippines
Statues of the Madonna and Child